On 2 December 2015, at the Theresienbad swimming pool in the Austrian capital Vienna, a 10-year-old boy was raped. The perpetrator, an Iraqi refugee who had arrived in the country two months earlier, claimed that he was motivated by not having sex for four months.

The crime became public knowledge in February 2016, and in June the man was sentenced to a minimum six years in jail. In October, the Supreme Court of Austria overturned his rape conviction and ordered a retrial. At the retrial his sentence was increased to 7 years. In May 2017, the man's sentence was reduced to four years.

The crime was one of several at the time which led to anti-refugee sentiment in Austria, and the overturning of the original conviction was condemned by Russian president Vladimir Putin.

Background and incident
The perpetrator was born in Iraq and had arrived in Vienna in September 2015, finding work as a taxi driver.

The victim is the son of a Serbian refugee.

The man raped the boy in a toilet room cubicle, causing physical injury, and then went diving. The child, known as Goran, told a lifeguard and the man was arrested.

Legal proceedings

The crime was not made public knowledge until February 2016, with the police giving the reason as to protect the victim. Thomas Keiblinger, spokesman of police in Vienna, denied that the incident had been covered up because the perpetrator was a refugee.

The perpetrator said that he had not had sex for four months as his partner had been ill since giving birth, so he "followed his desires" because he had "a marked surplus of sexual energy" and knew that his act would be illegal in any country of the world. His defence lawyers mentioned his youth, living conditions and no criminal record in mitigation.

In court, it was heard that the victim had been profoundly disturbed by the crime, and was considering suicide. His family was awarded €4,700 in compensation. The man was sentenced to six years in prison in June 2016, with a maximum 15 years, and possible deportation at the end.

In October 2016, the Austrian Supreme Court overturned the man's conviction of rape, ordering a retrial, while upholding his second charge of aggravated sexual assault of a minor. The rationale was that the prosecution had not provided evidence that the man did not know that his victim did not consent. The man was kept in police custody until his retrial where his sentence was increased to 7 years and the compensation award increased.

In May 2017, judge Thomas Philipp reduced the sentence to four years in a final decision by the Supreme Court, saying that the rape was a "one-off incident" and "you cannot lose your sense of proportion here".

Reaction
The crime led to a rise in anti-refugee sentiment in Austria. The New York Times mentioned it and the gang rape of a grandmother in Traiskirchen as incidents that were causing a growth in support for the Freedom Party of Austria candidate Norbert Hofer in the 2016 election.

Vladimir Putin, the president of Russia, spoke after the original conviction was overturned, a rare comment by him on the refugee crisis. He said "It doesn’t fit into my head what on earth they’re thinking over there. I can’t even explain the rationale – is it a sense of guilt before the migrants? What’s going on? It’s not clear. A society that cannot defend its children has no future".

References

2015 in Austria
2015 crimes in Austria
2010s in Vienna
2010s trials
Attacks in Europe in 2015
Child sexual abuse in Austria
Crime in Vienna
December 2015 crimes in Europe
Rape in Austria
Rape in the 2010s
Rape trials
Trials in Austria
Violence against men in Europe
Incidents of violence against boys